The men's 5000 metre relay in short track speed skating at the 1998 Winter Olympics took place on 19 and 21 February at the White Ring.

Results

Semifinals
The semifinals were held on 19 February. The top two teams in each semifinal qualified for the A final, while the third and fourth place teams advanced to the B Final.

Semifinal 1

Semifinal 2

Finals
The four qualifying teams competed in Final A, while four others raced in Final B.

Final A

Final B

References

Men's short track speed skating at the 1998 Winter Olympics